John Emmerson (born 1796 at Cambridge; death details unknown) was an English cricketer who was associated with Cambridge Town Club and made his first-class debut in 1827.

References

Bibliography
 

1796 births
Year of death unknown
English cricketers
English cricketers of 1826 to 1863
Cambridge Town Club cricketers